Kūčiukai (šližikai, prėskutė) also called Christmas cakes - is a traditional Lithuanian dish served on Kūčios, the traditional Christmas Eve dinner in Lithuania. They are small, slightly sweet pastries made from leavened dough and poppy seeds. There are variations in sweetness, it is usually eaten dry but can be served soaked in poppy milk or with cranberry kissel. Initially they were made as small loaves of bread served for the spirits - vėlės.

History 
Kūčia - is a dish once made from various grains and eaten with honey and poppies. Lithuanians named the shortest day of the year and the longest night after this dish, that is why it called Kūčios (engl.: Christmas Eve). The word 'Kūčia' comes from the ancient Greek word 'kokka' - stone, grain, seed. But scientists believe that this word came to Lithuania from the Slavs.

During the Christmas Eve people were leaving one seat at the table for all the spirits/souls which somehow relates or are important to the family. Formerly the dish was first given to the dead, by putting the food in an empty plate, in place which was left for them, and giving the minute of silence for spirits to come back for one evening, sit with their family and eat Christmas Eve dinner, and just after that everyone else can start eating too. And sometimes it is left over night, for spirits to enjoy. Some Lithuanian families still follow this tradition every year on Christmas Eve.

The ancient dish Kūčia was made from wheat, beans, peas, barley, poppies and seasoned with honey. In Aukštaitija, for some time, Kūčia was called porridge of coarse barley groats, eaten with poppies and tossing - honey-sweetened water. In Panevėžys region at the beginning of the 20th century, Kūčia was made from a mixture of wheat and peas flavored with water sweetened with poppies and honey. A common feature of the various Christmas variants was that the dish was made from whole or slightly crushed cereals, groats and flavored with honey, poppy seeds or hemp. After the First World War, small poppy seed buns were started to bake in Lithuania, which is called Kūčiukai. In Dzūkija, a flatbread was baked, which the family later broke and soaked in poppy milk. In Suvalkija, the buns were larger than they are now and elongated.

Small round wheat flour with yeast has acquired the common name for Kūčiukai (Christmas cakes) relatively recently. This dish became especially popular after the restoration of Independence, when Christmas celebrations began to be celebrated again. That’s probably happened most likely due to the fact that Christmas cakes have become widespread and popular all over the country due to their attractive shape and taste.

Kūčiukai also can be used for games, guesses, spells and gifts on a Christmas Eves magical night. According to ancient customs, housewives should bake Kūčiukai on the Christmas Eve day.

Preparation 
In some places, Kūčiukai were baked not only from wheat, but also from barley or buckwheat flour. You have to wipe the yeast with the sugar, heat the water a little and add the yeast and some flour. Stir, sprinkle with a layer of flour and place warm to rise. When the dough rises, add some more flour, oil, poppy seeds, salt and knead until the dough becomes elastic, no longer sticks to your hands. Place the kneaded dough in a warm place for 50-60 minutes to rise. Knead the raised dough well and roll the thin rollers. Cut them into pieces and sprinkle with floured tins. Bake for 6-8 mins in a 180 °C (356 °F) oven until nicely browned.

Sometimes Christmas cakes, especially in Suvalkija, are baked in the rollers and broken into small and cute pieces after baking it. Suvalkija’s Christmas cakes are slightly larger than the Aukštaičių or Žemaičių. In the end of XIX - beginning the XX centuries Kūčiukai were baked in a dough - trough on a pad or in clay pans, later in tins.

Name 
In different regions of the country the dish is called differently, there are counted about 25 different Christmas cake names, such as: prėskučiai, prėskieniai, šližikai (šlyžikai, sližikai), skrebučiai, riešutėliai, barškučiai, kleckai (kleckučiai, kleckiukai), parpeliai (parpeliukai), buldikai, galkutės, kalėdukai, pyragiukai (mini cakes), balbolikai, bambolikai, pulkeliai, pumpuliukai, kukuliai, propuliai, paršeliukai (engl.: piglet).

Meaning 
The importance of Kūčiukai during the holidays is no less important than the bread itself, which has been worshiped by Lithuanians since ancient times. Kūčiukai has an old symbolic meaning that has survived since pagan times: in ancient times, during the winter solstice, a loaf of bread was sacrificed to ancestors. Later, on the principle of the magic of similarity, that sacrifice of bread was replaced by the symbolic eating of Kūčiukai. We can say that Kūčiukai are a ceremonial bread to feed spirits – vėlės. They are like an analogue of real bread. It is not in vain that Kūčiukai is called the bread of spirits and the bread of the Last Supper, a symbol of love. This traditional Lithuanian meal is left on the table overnight to be enjoyed by family loved ones who are lying down of the eternal rest.

References

Christmas food
Lithuanian cuisine
Pastries with poppy seeds